The seventh Central American and Caribbean Games were held in Mexico City, the capital city of Mexico. The games were held from the 5 March to the 20 March 1954, and included 1,356 athletes from twelve nations.

Sports

References
 Meta
 

 
Central American and Caribbean Games, 1954
Central American and Caribbean Games
Central American and Caribbean Games, 1954
1954 in Caribbean sport
1954 in Mexican sports
1954 in Central American sport
Multi-sport events in Mexico
Sports competitions in Mexico City
1950s in Mexico City
March 1954 sports events in Mexico